Ibrahim Danda Rabiu (born 15 March 1991) is a Nigerian professional footballer who plays as an attacking midfielder.

Club career

Sporting CP
Rabiu was born in Kano. In summer 2007, he signed for Sporting CP for €450,000, in a joint ownership agreement with his previous club Gateway FC. Shortly afterwards, it was reported that Premier League sides Chelsea, Liverpool, Manchester United, and Arsenal were interested in signing him, but nothing came of it.

In late 2007, Rabiu was included by World Soccer in its 50 Most Exciting Teen Footballers list and, in March of the following year, he was featured by InsideFutbol.com in an article on young African footballers including Emmanuel Adebayor, Mario Balotelli and Mikel John Obi. In January 2009, he appeared in Goal.com's list of 10 African Players to Watch, and The Times' Football's Top 50 Rising Stars.

Rabiu participated in the 2008 Bellinzona Under-19 International Tournament with Sporting, with the Portuguese eventually winning the trophy. In the competition, in which he was eventually voted as the best player, he was deployed as a classic number 10 in a 4–2–3–1 system; one year later, he again led the Lisbon team to the final stage of the same tournament.

In October 2009, Rabiu twice rejected an offer of a professional contract, and was at that time sent on loan to Real S.C. in the third division. In January 2010 he drew interest from Scottish Premier League's Celtic, but the deal never materialised due to undisclosed reasons believed to involve work permit issues.

In 2010, Rabiu left Sporting as a free agent. Subsequently, Dutch side VVV-Venlo tried to sign him in partnership with a United Kingdom-based consortium, but the negotiations broke down due to financial issues. In December, shortly after Damien Comolli was appointed director of football at Anfield, the player was again linked to Liverpool.

PSV
In January 2011, Rabiu went on trial with Eerste Divisie club Telstar through an investment group. After performing well in a friendly against PSV Eindhoven and later being described as one of the best players in the match by the team's coach, he was quickly offered a contract, pending a valid work permit from the Royal Dutch Football Association.

However, Telstar could not afford to sign Rabiu even with the help of private investors. Subsequently, he went on trial with PSV, scoring twice in a 2–0 win against their reserves in a practice match – the first team's coach, Fred Rutten, said: "Ibrahim is fast, technically skilled, physically strong and has a good sense of field position, there is something in that boy"; on 11 March 2011, he agreed to a deal at the Eredivisie side.

In December 2011, Rabiu's agent reached a mutual agreement with PSV to terminate the player's contract, because of limited first-team action.

Celtic
On 18 January 2012, Celtic announced that, after a successful trial period, they had agreed terms to sign Rabiu on a three and-a-half-year deal, pending a work permit application which was granted five days later. He revealed that he turned down a move to clubs in England and Germany to join the Glasgow team, believing it could help him restore his reputation.

Rabiu made his debut on 3 May 2012, coming on as a 74th-minute substitute in a 1–0 home victory over St Johnstone: his cross gave Gary Hooper the chance to score, but he was offside.

Kilmarnock
On 2 January 2013, Kilmarnock manager Kenny Shiels confirmed that Rabiu had signed a two-year contract with the club on a free transfer. The 21-year-old decided to move to Rugby Park in search of regular first-team football; he also stated that his choice was due to his new team having a similar style to that of FC Barcelona, whilst Shiels said that the move was good for the player's career and that he would attempt to 'get inside his head' to help him find his form.

Rabiu made his debut for the East Ayrshire team two weeks after signing, coming on as a substitute for Paul Heffernan in a goalless draw against Dundee United. He finished his first season with only six appearances.

On 19 October 2013, Rabiu collapsed in the first half of a league fixture against Ross County and was taken to the nearby University Hospital Crosshouse. The following January, both he and his compatriot Reuben Gabriel were released.

International career
Rabiu was a member of the Nigerian under-17 team in the 2007 FIFA World Cup in South Korea, scoring in the first match against France as the nation went on to win the competition. Before the tournament, he had been dubbed "the new Jay-Jay Okocha", and helped the side win that year's Africa U-17 Cup of Nations held in Togo, scoring twice against Eritrea in the group stage (8–0).

Aged 16, Rabiu was included in the senior squad by German coach Berti Vogts for the 2008 Africa Cup of Nations, with his under-17 teammate Haruna Lukman. However, a groin injury prevented him from participating in the tournament.

In 2009, Rabiu helped Nigeria to win bronze in the African Youth Championship in Rwanda, netting against Ivory Coast and South Africa, with the national team securing a place in that year's FIFA U-20 World Cup where he appeared in three matches, scoring against Germany in the 2–3 round-of-16 loss; in addition to his six goals in the youth levels, he also provided many assists.

In the following years, Rabiu continued to be closely watched by the Nigerian senior coaches, with Samson Siasia claiming in the media in April 2010 that he was one of only two players who could solve the country's attacking midfield problems. Siasia was appointed in November 2010 and the player was called up to his first camp ahead of the 2013 Africa Cup of Nations, but the manager in charge was now Stephen Keshi.

Rabiu earned his first full cap on 13 June 2015, playing for 32 minutes in a 2–0 home win over Chad in Kaduna for the 2017 Africa Cup of Nations qualifiers.

Personal life
Rabiu is a practising Muslim.

Club statistics

Honours
PSV
KNVB Cup: 2011–12

Celtic
Scottish Cup: 2012–13

Trenčín
Slovak Super Liga: 2014–15, 2015–16
Slovak Cup: 2014–15, 2015–16

Slovan Bratislava
Slovak Super Liga: 2018–19, 2019–20, 2020–21, 2021–22
Slovak Cup: 2019–20, 2020–21

Nigeria
FIFA U-17 World Cup: 2007
African U-17 Championship: 2007
African Youth Championship bronze medal: 2009

References

External links
AS Trenčín official profile 

1991 births
Living people
Nigerian Muslims
Sportspeople from Kano
Nigerian footballers
Association football midfielders
Gateway United F.C. players
Segunda Divisão players
Sporting CP footballers
Real S.C. players
Eredivisie players
PSV Eindhoven players
Scottish Premier League players
Scottish Professional Football League players
Celtic F.C. players
Kilmarnock F.C. players
Slovak Super Liga players
AS Trenčín players
ŠK Slovan Bratislava players
Belgian Pro League players
K.A.A. Gent players
Nigeria youth international footballers
Nigeria under-20 international footballers
Nigeria international footballers
Nigerian expatriate footballers
Expatriate footballers in Portugal
Expatriate footballers in the Netherlands
Expatriate footballers in Scotland
Expatriate footballers in Slovakia
Expatriate footballers in Belgium
Nigerian expatriate sportspeople in Portugal
Nigerian expatriate sportspeople in the Netherlands
Nigerian expatriate sportspeople in Scotland
Nigerian expatriate sportspeople in Slovakia
Nigerian expatriate sportspeople in Belgium